"The Seashores of Old Mexico" is a country music song written by Merle Haggard. It was recorded by Hank Snow in 1971, Freddy Weller in 1972, Haggard himself in 1974, and in 1987 Haggard and Willie Nelson recut the song as a duet. Snow's version was a Top Ten hit in Canada, peaking at #6 on the RPM Top Country Tracks charts.

George Strait recorded a version, released as the last single, from his 2005 album Somewhere Down in Texas. Strait's version peaked at #11 on the Billboard Hot Country Songs chart in 2006. "The Seashores of Old Mexico" was nominated for Best Male Country Vocal Performance at the 2007 Grammy Awards.

Content
The song is about a young man wanted in Tucson, Arizona. He decides there is a better life for him in Mexico; so he packs up all of his stuff and moves to Mexico. He loses all of his money the first night in Mexico playing poker. When his truck breaks down, he hitches a ride to the beach towns of Mexico where he finds love and lives out the rest of his life.

Music video
A music video for this song with George Strait was filmed in February 2006 in Tulum, Mexico and directed by Trey Fanjoy.

Chart history

Hank Snow

George Strait

Year-end charts

References

1971 songs
1971 singles
2006 singles
Hank Snow songs
Freddy Weller songs
Merle Haggard songs
Willie Nelson songs
George Strait songs
Male vocal duets
Music videos directed by Trey Fanjoy
Song recordings produced by Tony Brown (record producer)
Songs written by Merle Haggard
MCA Nashville Records singles
Songs about Mexico